Michael Riddle may refer to:
Mike Riddle (born 1986), skier
Michael Riddle (programmer), inventor of the Interact computer software